Elena Richter (born 3 July 1989) is a retired German archer. She contested the 2012 Summer Olympics in the women's individual competition, where she was eliminated in the second knockout round placing 30th place in the preliminary ranking round.

Richter achieved her first senior title with gold medal at the 2012 World Field Archery Championships in Val d'Isère, and became Germany's first female winner of an Archery World Cup gold medal after victory in the tournament's opening stage in Shanghai. Richter was also a three-time German national champion, winning her third title in 2019 after defeating 2016 Olympic silver medalist Lisa Unruh. In 2019, she also won the gold medal in the women's individual event at the 2019 Military World Games held in Wuhan, China.

Richter announced her retirement from archery in August 2020 after the 2020 Summer Olympics were postponed due to the COVID-19 pandemic.

References

External links 
 
 

1989 births
Living people
Archers at the 2012 Summer Olympics
German female archers
Olympic archers of Germany
Sportspeople from Berlin
Archers at the 2015 European Games
European Games competitors for Germany
World Games silver medalists
Competitors at the 2013 World Games
Archers at the 2019 European Games
World Games medalists in archery
21st-century German women
20th-century German women